A Mobile Inshore Undersea Warfare Unit (MIUWU) was a component of the United States Navy's Force Protection Package tasked with providing seaward security to joint logistics over-the-shore operations from either a port or harbor complex or unimproved beach sites. The mobile inshore undersea warfare unit often made up of Seabee rates is equipped with mobile logistics, radar, sonar, and communications equipment located within mobile elements, such as a tent, specially modified HMMWV, or truck-mountable container.

Units 
 Group One (West)
 MIUWU 101 - Seattle WA
 MIUWU 102 - Spokane WA
 MIUWU 103 - San Francisco CA
 MIUWU 104 - San Jose CA
 MIUWS  Unit 11 - Long Beach CA
 MIUWS  Unit 12 - Long Beach CA
 MIUWS  Unit 13 - Long Beach CA
 MIUWU 106 - San Diego CA
 MIUWU 107 - San Diego CA
 MIUWU 108 - Corpus Christi TX
 MIUWU 109 - Dallas TX
 MIUWU 110 - Portland O
 MIUWU 112 - St. Louis MO
 MIUWU 113 - Oklahoma City OK
 MIUWU 114 - Whiteman AFB MO
 Group Two (East)
 MIUWU 201 - Perrysburg OH
 MIUWU 202 - Newport RI
 MIUWU 203 - Bronx NY
 MIUWU 204 - Fort Dix NJ
 MIUWU 205 - Charleston SC
 MIUWU 206 - Norfolk VA
 MIUWU 207 - Jacksonville FL
 MIUWU 208 - Hialeah FL
MIUWU  209 - Mobile Ala.
 MIUWU 210 - Fort McHenry MD
 MIUWU 211 - Charlotte NC
 MIUWU 212 - Gulfport MS
 MIUWU 213 - Milwaukee, WI
 MIUWU 214 - Buffalo NY

See also
United States Navy
Naval Coastal Warfare
Enlisted Expeditionary Warfare Specialist
Maritime Expeditionary Security Force
Expeditionary war

References 
 

Military units and formations of the United States Navy